The 2021–22 UMass Minutemen ice hockey season was the 90th season of play for the program. They represented the University of Massachusetts Amherst in the 2021–22 NCAA Division I men's ice hockey season and for the 28th season in the Hockey East conference. The Minutemen were coached by Greg Carvel, in his sixth season, and played their home games at Mullins Center.

Season
Fresh off of the program's first national championship, Massachusetts would have to overcome a sizable loss of talent if they wanted a repeat performance. While the team still possessed many returning players, including tournament MOP Bobby Trivigno, several players had left early for professional careers after outstanding seasons. While the team lost Filip Lindberg, Matt Murray had shared the starting role in net so the team was not without an experienced and proven goaltender. However, the losses were felt in the opening weekend when the Minutemen were swept by Minnesota State at home.

The team performed better over the succeeding month and won each of their next six games but then played poorly in the middle of November and saw their ranking sink down into the mid-teens. UMass suffered from Hockey East's poor performance in non-conference games. This meant that victories against their conference rivals, even ranked opponents, would not help their postseason hopes as much as it would in other years. For the remainder of the season, Massachusetts would hover around #10 in the national rankings as they weren't able to put together any extended winning streaks. Throughout the team's up and down play, Trivigno was the leading light offensively. Not only did he finish 16 points better than any other Minuteman but he ended up tied for third in the national scoring race.

Entering the final week of the regular season, UMass had a 5-point lead in the conference standings and needed just one point to guarantee itself a share of the Hockey East title. Instead, the Minutemen lost both games to Boston College by 1-goal margins while Northeastern swept its weekend finale to surge past Massachusetts. Aside from the stunning result, the losses forced UMass to play Providence in the quarterfinals. The Minutemen were badly outshot by the Friars in the match, 19–47, but Matt Murray stood tall and held the fort while the offense made the most of its sparse opportunities. They were again outshot in the semifinal, though that time only by 4, and managed to knock off Massachusetts Lowell behind Trivigno's second game-winner of the postseason.

Before the championship game, UMass knew they were mathematically guaranteed to receive a bid to the NCAA tournament but they weren't going to let that slow them down. Trivigno tied the game just past the midway point and, though he didn't net the winner, he assisted on the final goal that sealed their second consecutive Hockey East Championship.

Despite riding high after a conference victory, UMass could still only garner a #3 seed for the national tournament. This forced the team into an underdog role against one of the tournament favorites, Minnesota. The Minutemen got off to a decent start and then netted two quick goals in the later half of the first. The Gophers added their own before the period was out but UMass rebuilt its 2-goal advantage early in the second. After that, however, Minnesota slowly chipped away at Massachusetts' lead and ended up tying the game on the power play late in the third. Once overtime began, both teams looked to end things quickly. Unfortunately for the Minutemen, it was Ben Meyers, captain of the Gophers, who scored the final goal and ended the Minutemen's season.

Departures

Recruiting

Roster
As of August 12, 2021.

Standings

Schedule and results

|-
!colspan=12 style=";" | Regular season

|-
!colspan=12 style=";" | 

|-
!colspan=12 style=";" |

Scoring statistics

Goaltending statistics

Rankings

Note: USCHO did not release a poll in week 24.

Awards and honors

Players drafted into the NHL

2022 NHL Entry Draft

† incoming freshman

References

2021-22
UMass
UMass
UMass
UMass